The 10 cm Kanone 04 (10 cm K 04) was a field gun used by Germany in World War I. It was the second heavy gun with modern recoil system accepted by the German Army. It was produced as a replacement for the 10 cm K 99 and the lange 15 cm Kanone 92. Although the standard version lacked a gunshield, some models, such as the 10 cm K 04/12, were fitted with a special gunshield and some other minor modifications. There was only 32 in service at the outbreak of the war.

It could be transported in one load by a team of six horses, or it could be broken down into two loads (tandem hitches) for crossing rough terrain.

References 
 Jäger, Herbert. German Artillery of World War One. Ramsbury, Marlborough, Wiltshire: Crowood Press, 2001

Notes

External links
10 cm K 04 on Landships
Development of the 10 cm Kanone on Lovett Artillery Collection
List and pictures of World War I surviving 10cm K 04 guns

World War I guns
Field artillery of Germany
World War I artillery of Germany
105 mm artillery